The effects of climate change impact the physical environment, ecosystems and human societies. The environmental effects of climate change are broad and far-reaching. They affect the water cycle, oceans, sea and land ice (glaciers), sea level, as well as weather and climate extreme events. The changes in climate are not uniform across the Earth. In particular, most land areas have warmed faster than most ocean areas, and the Arctic is warming faster than most other regions. The regional changes vary: at high latitudes it is the average temperature that is increasing, while for the oceans and tropics it is in particular the rainfall and the water cycle where changes are observed. The magnitude of impacts of climate change can be reduced by climate change mitigation and adaptation.

Climate change has degraded land by raising temperatures, drying soils and increasing wildfire risk. Recent warming has strongly affected natural biological systems. Species worldwide are migrating poleward to colder areas. On land, many species move to higher elevations, whereas marine species seek colder water at greater depths. Between 1% and 50% of species on land were assessed to be at substantially higher risk of extinction due to climate change. 

Among the effects of climate change on oceans are: an increase in sea surface temperature as well as ocean temperatures at greater depths, more frequent marine heatwaves, a reduction in pH value, a rise in sea level from ocean warming and ice sheet melting, sea ice decline in the Arctic, increased upper ocean stratification, reductions in oxygen levels, increased contrasts in salinity (salty areas becoming saltier and fresher areas becoming less salty), changes to ocean currents including a weakening of the Atlantic meridional overturning circulation, and stronger tropical cyclones and monsoons. The uptake of carbon dioxide from the atmosphere is leading to ocean acidification. All these changes have knock-on effects which disturb marine ecosystems. 

Food security and access to fresh water are at risk due to rising temperatures. Climate change has profound impacts on human health, directly via heat stress and indirectly via the spread of infectious diseases. The vulnerability and exposure of humans to climate change varies by economic sector and by country. Wealthy industrialised countries, which have emitted the most CO2, have more resources and so are the least vulnerable to global warming. Economic sectors that are likely to be affected include agriculture, fisheries, forestry, energy, insurance, financial services, tourism, and recreation. Some groups may be particularly at risk from climate change, such as the poor, women, children and indigenous peoples. They also have much lower levels of capacity for coping with the effects of environmental change. Climate change can result in environmental migration, especially in developing countries where people are directly dependent on land for food.

Observed and future changes in temperature

Global warming affects all elements of Earth's climate system. Global surface temperatures have risen by 1 °C and are expected to rise further in the future.  Night-time temperatures have increased faster than daytime temperatures. The impact on the environment, wildlife, society and humanity depends on how much more the Earth warms.  

One of the methods scientists use to predict the effects of human-caused climate change is to investigate past natural changes in climate. To assess changes in Earth's past climate scientists have studied tree rings, ice cores, corals, and ocean and lake sediments. These show that recent warming has surpassed anything in the last 2,000 years. By the end of the 21st century, temperatures may increase to a level not experienced since the mid-Pliocene, around 3 million years ago. At that time, mean global temperatures were about 2–4 °C warmer than pre-industrial temperatures, and the global mean sea level was up to 25 meters higher than it is today.How much the world warms depends on what humans do or not to limit GHG emissions, and how sensitive the climate is to greenhouse gases. Scientists are pretty sure that with double the amount of GHG in the atmosphere the world would warm by 2.5 °C to 4 °C; but how much more humans will emit is less certain. The projected magnitude of warming by 2100 is closely related to the level of cumulative emissions over the 21st century (total emissions between 2000 and 2100). The higher the cumulative emissions over this time period, the greater the level of warming is projected to occur.  

Instead, temperatures would stay elevated at the same level for several centuries. After about a thousand years, 20% to 30% of human-emitted  will remain in the atmosphere, not taken up by the ocean or the land, committing the climate to a warmer state long after emissions have stopped.

Weather-related changes 
The lower and middle atmosphere, where nearly all of the weather occurs, are heating due to the enhanced greenhouse effect. Increased greenhouse gases cause the higher parts of the atmosphere, the stratosphere, to cool. The heated atmosphere contains more water vapour, which is also a greenhouse gas and acts as a self-reinforcing feedback.

As temperatures increase, so does evaporation and atmospheric moisture content that increases heating by trapping outgoing radiation. Excess water vapour gets caught up in storms and makes them more intense, larger, and potentially longer lasting, so that rain and snow events are stronger and increase risk of flooding. Extra drying worsens any natural dry spells and droughts, and increases risk of heat waves and wildfires.

Climate change makes many aspects of weather more extreme, especially heat waves, drought, rain intensity, and storm size and intensity.. Global warming leads to an increase in extreme weather events such as heat waves, droughts, cyclones, blizzards and rainstorms. Such events will continue to occur more often and with greater intensity. 

Extreme event attribution, also known as attribution science, is a field of study in meteorology and climate science that tries to measure how ongoing climate change directly affects recent extreme weather events.

Rain and snow 

Warming by greenhouse gas forcing has increased contrasts in rainfall amounts between wet and dry seasons, meaning "wet seasons are getting wetter, dry seasons are getting drier". Over oceans, salty areas are getting saltier and other regions are becoming less saline. Warming has also resulted in a detectable increase in the precipitation of northern high latitudes. 

Higher temperatures lead to increased evaporation and surface drying. As the air warms, its water-holding capacity also increases, particularly over the oceans. Air can hold 7% more water vapour for every degree Celsius it is warmed. Changes have already been observed in the amount, intensity, frequency, and type of precipitation. Widespread increases in heavy precipitation have occurred even in places where total rain amounts have decreased.

In the case of precipitation, the rising temperatures and extra heat will "intensify" the Earth's water cycle, which means it will increase evaporation. Increased atmospheric water vapour results in more frequent and intense downpours and causes stronger extended droughts in certain regions. As a result, storm-affected areas are likely to experience increases in precipitation and an increased risk of flooding. In contrast, areas far away from storm tracks are likely to experience less precipitation and an increased risk of drought. Overall, there is likely to be longer hot dry spells, broken by more intense heavy rainfalls (along the lines of the English proverb "it never rains but it pours!").

Changes in regional climate are expected to include greater temperature increases over land, with most warming at high northern latitudes, and least warming over the Southern Ocean and parts of the North Atlantic Ocean. Future changes in precipitation are expected to follow existing trends, with reduced precipitation over subtropical land areas, and increased precipitation at subpolar latitudes and some equatorial regions.

Heat waves and temperature extremes 

Climate change will lead to more very hot days and fewer very cold days. The frequency, length and intensity of heat waves will very likely increase over most land areas. Higher growth in greenhouse gas emissions would cause more frequent and severe temperature extremes. Globally, cold waves have decreased in frequency. 

Heatwaves over land have become more frequent and more intense since the 1950s due to climate change in almost all world regions. Furthermore, heat waves are more likely to occur simultaneously with droughts. Marine heatwaves have also increased in frequency, with a doubling since 1980. The intensity of individual heat waves can often be attributed to global warming. Some extreme events would have been nearly impossible without human influence on the climate system. A heatwave that would occur once every ten years before global warming started, now occurs 2.8 times as often. Under further warming, heatwaves are set to become more frequent. An event that would occur each ten year, would occur every other year if global warming reaches 2 °C.

Heat waves are events where the daily maximum temperature exceeds the average maximum temperature by 5 °C (9 °F) for more than five consecutive days. In the last 30–40 years (prior to 2018), heat waves with high humidity have become more frequent and severe. Extremely hot nights have doubled in frequency. The area in which extremely hot summers are observed has increased 50–100 fold. Heat waves with high humidity pose a big risk to human health while heat waves with low humidity lead to dry conditions that increase wildfires. The mortality from extreme heat is larger than the mortality from hurricanes, lightning, tornadoes, floods, and earthquakes together.

It was estimated in 2013 that global warming had increased the probability of local record-breaking monthly temperatures worldwide by a factor of 5. This was compared to a baseline climate in which no global warming had occurred. Using a medium global warming scenario, they project that by 2040, the number of monthly heat records globally could be more than 12 times greater than that of a scenario with no long-term warming.

Study results indicate that limiting global warming to 1.5 °C would prevent most of the tropics from reaching the wet-bulb temperature of the human physiological limit of 35 °C.

There is some evidence climate change leads to a weakening of the polar vortex, which would make the jet stream more wavy. This would lead to outbursts of very cold winter weather across parts of Eurasia and North America, as well as very warm air incursions into the Arctic.

Tropical cyclones and storms

Weather-related impacts

Floods 

A warming climate will intensify rainfall events. When floods occur in this warmer future, these floods will be more severe. Some regions will experience an increase in flooding, some a decrease. This depends on several factors, such as changes in snowmelt, soil moisture and rainfall. Flooding can be in the form of urban flooding, river flooding or coastal flooding, Sea level rise further increases risks of coastal flooding: if sea levels rise by a further 0.15 m, 20% more people will be exposed to a 1 in a 100-year coastal flood, assuming no population growth and no further adaptation. With an extra 0.75 m, this rises to a doubling of people exposed.

Global warming makes bigger storm events more common due to an intensification of the water cycle. This increase in the frequency of large storm events would alter existing Intensity-Duration-Frequency curves (IDF curves) due to the change in frequency, but also by lifting and steepening the curves in the future.

Droughts 
Climate change affects multiple factors associated with droughts, such as how much rain falls and how fast the rain evaporates again. Warming over land drives an increase in atmospheric evaporative demand which will increase the severity and frequency of droughts around much of the world. Scientists predict that in some regions of the world, there will be less rain in future due to global warming. These regions will therefore be more prone to drought in future: subtropical regions like the Mediterranean, southern Africa, south-western Australia and south-western South America, as well as tropical Central America, western Africa and the Amazon basin.

Physics dictates that higher temperatures lead to increased evaporation. The effect of this is soil drying and increased plant stress which will have impacts on agriculture. For this reason, even those regions where large changes in precipitation are not expected (such as central and northern Europe) will experience soil drying. The latest prediction of scientists in 2022 is that "If emissions of greenhouse gases are not curtailed, about a third of global land areas are projected to suffer from at least moderate drought by 2100". When droughts occur they are likely to be more intense than in the past.  

Due to limitations on how much data is available about drought in the past, it is often impossible to confidently attribute a specific drought to human-induced climate change. Some areas however, such as the Mediterranean and California, already show the impacts of human activities. Their impacts are made worse because of increased water demand, population growth, urban expansion, and environmental protection efforts in many areas.

The frequency and the duration of droughts have both increased: They increased by 29% from the year 2000 to 2022. The prediction is that by 2050 more than 75% of humanity will live in drought conditions. Land restoration, especially by agroforestry, can help reduce the impact of droughts.

In 2019 the Intergovernmental Panel on Climate Change issued a Special Report on Climate Change and Land. The main statements of the report include: Between 1960 and 2013 the area of drylands in drought increased by 1% per year. In 2015, around 500 million people lived in areas impacted by desertification between the 1980s and 2000s. People who live in areas affected by land degradation and desertification are "increasingly negatively affected by climate change".

In the past, there were some apparently conflicting results in the scientific literature about how drought is changing due to climate change. This was found to be mostly due to problems with collection and analysis of data, for example in the formulation of the Palmer Drought Severity Index (PDSI) and the data sets used to determine the evapotranspiration component. The accurate attribution of the causes of drought also requires accounting for natural variability, especially El Niño Southern Oscillation (ENSO) effects and better analysis of precipitation data.

Wildfires 

Globally, climate change promotes the type of weather that makes wildfires more likely. In some areas, an increase of wildfires has been attributed directly to climate change. That warmer climate conditions pose more risks of wildfire is consistent with evidence from Earth's past: there was more fire in warmer periods, and less in colder climatic periods. Climate change increases evaporation, which can cause vegetation to dry out. When a fire starts in an area with very dry vegetation, it can spread rapidly. Higher temperatures can also make the fire season longer, the time period in which severe wildfires are most likely. In regions where snow is disappearing, the fire season may get particularly more extended.

Even though weather conditions are raising the risks of wildfires, the total area burnt by wildfires has decreased globally. This is mostly the result of the conversion of savanna into croplands, after which there is less forest area that can burn. Prescribed burning, an indigenous practice in the US and Australia, can reduce the area burnt too, and may form an adaptation to increased risk. The carbon released from wildfires can further increase greenhouse gas concentrations. This feedback is not yet fully integrated into climate models.

Oceans 

From 1850 until 2022, the ocean has absorbed 26 % of total anthropogenic emissions. Emissions during the period 1850–2021 amounted to 670 ± 65 gigatons of carbon and were partitioned among the atmosphere (41 %), ocean (26 %), and land (31 %).

Ice and snow

The cryosphere, the area of the Earth covered by snow or ice, is extremely sensitive to changes in global climate. Northern Hemisphere average annual snow cover has declined in recent decades. This pattern is consistent with warmer global temperatures. Some of the largest declines have been observed in the spring and summer months.  During the 21st century, snow cover is projected to continue its retreat in almost all regions.

Glaciers and ice sheets decline

Since the beginning of the twentieth century, there has been a widespread retreat of glaciers.  The melting of the Greenland and West Antarctic ice sheets will continue to contribute to sea level rise over long time-scales. The Greenland ice sheet loss is mainly driven by melt from the top, whereas Antarctic ice loss is driven by warm ocean water melting the outlet glaciers. Research on Antarctica published in 2022, including the first map of iceberg calving, doubles the previous estimates of loss from ice shelves.

Future melt of the West Antarctic ice sheet is potentially abrupt under a high emission scenario, as a consequence of a partial collapse. Part of the ice sheet is grounded on bedrock below sea level, making it possibly vulnerable to the self-enhancing process of marine ice sheet instability. A further hypothesis is that marine ice cliff instability would also contribute to a partial collapse, but limited evidence is available for its importance. A partial collapse of the ice sheet would lead to rapid sea level rise and a local decrease in ocean salinity. It would be irreversible on a timescale between decades and millennia.

In contrast to the West Antarctic ice sheet, melt of the Greenland ice sheet is projected to be taking place more gradually over millennia. Sustained warming between 1 °C (low confidence) and 4 °C (medium confidence) would lead to a complete loss of the ice sheet, contributing 7 m to sea levels globally. The ice loss could become irreversible due to a further self-enhancing feedback: the elevation-surface mass balance feedback. When ice melts on top of the ice sheet, the elevation drops. As air temperature is higher at lower altitude, this promotes further melt.

Sea ice changes 

Sea ice reflects 50% to 70% of the incoming solar radiation, while 6% of the incoming solar energy is reflected by the ocean. With less solar energy, the sea ice absorbs and holds the surface colder, which can be a positive feedback toward climate change. As the climate warms, snow cover and sea ice extent decrease. Large-scale measurements of sea-ice have only been possible since the satellite era. The age of the sea ice is an important feature of the state of the sea ice cover.

Arctic sea ice decline 
Arctic sea ice began to decline at the beginning of the twentieth century but the rate is accelerating. Since 1979, satellite records indicate the decline in summer sea ice coverage has been about 13% per decade. The thickness of sea ice has also decreased by 66% or 2.0 m over the last six decades with a shift from permanent ice to largely seasonal ice cover. While ice-free summers are expected to be rare at 1.5 °C degrees of warming, they are set to occur at least once every decade at a warming level of 2.0 °C. The Arctic will likely become ice-free at the end of some summers before 2050.

Sea ice changes in Antarctica 

The annual mean Antarctic sea ice area is not showing a clear downwards or upwards trend over the period of reliable satellite data starting in 1979. There are remaining uncertainties on how to interpret this data due to the limited observational records and discrepancies between modelled and observed results for the sea ice cover.

Permafrost thawing 
The southern part of the Arctic region (home to 4 million people) has experienced a temperature rise of 1 °C to 3 °C (1.8 °F to 5.4 °F) over the last 50 years. Canada, Alaska and Russia are experiencing initial melting of permafrost. This may disrupt ecosystems and by increasing bacterial activity in the soil lead to these areas becoming carbon sources instead of carbon sinks. Eastern Siberia's permafrost is gradually disappearing in the southern regions, leading to the loss of nearly 11% of Siberia's nearly 11,000 lakes since 1971. At the same time, western Siberia is at the initial stage where melting permafrost is creating new lakes, which will eventually start disappearing as in the east. Furthermore, permafrost melting will eventually cause methane release from melting permafrost peat bogs.

Wildlife and nature 

Recent warming has strongly affected natural biological systems. Species worldwide are moving poleward to colder areas. On land, species may move to higher elevations, whereas marine species find colder water at greater depths. Of the drivers with the biggest global impact on nature, climate change ranks third over the five decades before 2020, with only change in land use and sea use, and direct exploitation of organisms having a greater impact.

The impacts of climate change in nature and nature's contributions to humans are projected to become more pronounced in the next few decades. Examples of climatic disruptions include fire, drought, pest infestation, invasion of species, storms, and coral bleaching events. The stresses caused by climate change, added to other stresses on ecological systems (e.g. land conversion, land degradation, harvesting, and pollution), threaten substantial damage to or complete loss of some unique ecosystems, and extinction of some critically endangered species. Key interactions between species within ecosystems are often disrupted because species from one location do not move to colder habitats at the same rate, giving rise to rapid changes in the functioning of the ecosystem. Impacts include changes in regional rainfall patterns, earlier leafing of trees and plants over many regions; movements of species to higher latitudes and altitudes in the Northern Hemisphere; changes in bird migrations in Europe, North America and Australia; and shifting of the oceans' plankton and fish from cold- to warm-adapted communities.

Ecosystems on land 

Climate change has been estimated to be a major driver of biodiversity loss in cool conifer forests, savannas, mediterranean-climate systems, tropical forests, and the Arctic tundra. In other ecosystems, land-use change may be a stronger driver of biodiversity loss, at least in the near-term. Beyond the year 2050, climate change may be the major driver for biodiversity loss globally. Climate change interacts with other pressures such as habitat modification, pollution and invasive species. Interacting with these pressures, climate change increases extinction risk for a large fraction of terrestrial and freshwater species. Between 1% and 50% of species in different groups were assessed to be at substantially higher risk of extinction due to climate change.

Amazon rainforest 

Rainfall that falls on the Amazon rainforest is recycled when it evaporates back into the atmosphere instead of running off away from the rainforest. This water is essential for sustaining the rainforest. Due to deforestation the rainforest is losing this ability, exacerbated by climate change which brings more frequent droughts to the area. The higher frequency of droughts seen in the first two decades of the 21st century, as well as other data, signal that a tipping point from rainforest to savanna might be close. One study concluded that this ecosystem could enter a mode of a 50-years-long collapse to a savanna around 2021, after which it would become increasingly and disproportionally more difficult to prevent or reverse this shift.

Marine ecosystems 

Marine heatwaves have seen an increased frequency and have widespread impacts on life in the oceans, such as mass dying events and coral bleaching. Harmful algae blooms have increased in response to warming waters, loss of oxygen and eutrophication. Between one-quarter and one-third of our fossil fuel emissions are consumed by the earth's oceans, which are now 30 percent more acidic than they were in pre-industrial times. This acidification poses a serious threat to aquatic life, particularly creatures such as oysters, clams, and coral with calcified shells or skeletons. Melting sea ice destroys habitat, including for algae that grows on its underside.  It is likely that the oceans warmed faster between 1993 and 2017 compared to the period starting in 1969.

Warm water coral reefs are very sensitive to global warming and ocean acidification. Coral reefs provide a habitat for thousands of species and ecosystem services such as coastal protection and food. The resilience of reefs can be improved by curbing local pollution and overfishing, but 70–90% of today's warm water coral reefs will disappear even if warming is kept to 1.5 °C. Coral reefs are not the only framework organisms, organisms that build physical structures that form habitats for other sea creatures, affected by climate change: mangroves and seagrass are considered to be at moderate risk for lower levels of global warming according to the Special Report on the Ocean and Cryosphere in a Changing Climate.

Tipping points and irreversible impacts

Self-reinforcing feedbacks amplify climate change. The climate system exhibits "threshold behaviour" or tipping points when these feedbacks lead parts of the Earth system into a new state, such as the runaway loss of ice sheets or the destruction of forests. Tipping points are studied using data from Earth's distant past and by physical modelling. There is already moderate risk of global tipping points at 1 °C above pre-industrial temperatures, and that risk becomes high at 2.5 °C.

Tipping points are "perhaps the most 'dangerous' aspect of future climate changes", leading to irreversible impacts on society. Many tipping points are interlinked, so that triggering one may lead to a cascade of effects, even well below 2 °C of warming. A 2018 study states that 45% of environmental problems, including those caused by climate change are interconnected and make the risk of a domino effect bigger.

There are a number of climate change impacts on the environment that may be irreversible, at least over the timescale of many human generations. These include the large-scale singularities such as the melting of the Greenland and West Antarctic ice sheets, and changes to the Atlantic Meridional Overturning Circulation. In biological systems, the extinction of species would be an irreversible impact. In social systems, unique cultures may be lost or the survival of endangered languages may be exacerbated due to climate change. For example, humans living on atoll islands face risks due to sea level rise, sea surface warming, and increased frequency and intensity of extreme weather events.

Health, food security and water security

Health

Food security 

Climate change will impact agriculture and food production around the world due to the effects of elevated CO2 in the atmosphere; higher temperatures; altered precipitation and transpiration regimes; increased frequency of extreme events; and modified weed, pest, and pathogen pressure. Droughts result in crop failures and the loss of pasture for livestock. Loss and poor growth of livestock cause milk yield and meat production to decrease. The rate of soil erosion is 10–20 times higher than the rate of soil accumulation in agricultural areas that use no-till farming. In areas with tilling it is 100 times higher. Climate change makes this type of land degradation and desertification worse.

Climate change is projected to negatively affect all four pillars of food security: not only how much food is available, but also how easy food is to access (prices), food quality and how stable the food system is. 
For example, climate change is already affecting the productivity of wheat and other key staples. The availability, quality and stability of wines are impacted by shifts in temperature affecting the traditional range and practices of  viniculture, and by smoke taint from extreme fire events.

In many areas, fisheries have already seen their catch decrease because of global warming and changes in biochemical cycles. In combination with overfishing, warming waters decrease the maximum catch potential. Global catch potential is projected to reduce further in 2050 by less than 4% if emissions are reduced strongly, and by about 8% for very high future emissions, with growth in the Arctic Ocean.

Water security 
Between 1.5 and 2.5 billion people live in areas with regular water security issues. If global warming would reach , water insecurity would affect about twice as many people. Water resources are projected to decrease in most dry subtropical regions and mid-latitudes, but increase in high latitudes. However, as streamflow becomes more variable, even regions with increased water resources can experience additional short-term shortages. The arid regions of India, China, the US and Africa are already seeing dry spells and drought impact water availability.

Water resources can be affected by climate change in various ways. The total amount of freshwater available can change, for instance due to dry spells or droughts. Heavy rainfall and flooding can have an impact on water quality: pollutants can be transported into water bodies by the increased surface runoff. In coastal regions, more salt may find its way into water resources due to higher sea levels and more intense storms. Higher temperatures also directly degrade water quality: warm water contains less oxygen.

Economic impacts

Economic forecasts of the impact of global warming vary considerably. Researchers have warned that current economic modelling may seriously underestimate the impact of potentially catastrophic climate change, and point to the need for new models that give a more accurate picture of potential damages. Nevertheless, one 2018 study found that potential global economic gains if countries implement mitigation strategies to comply with the 2 °C target set at the Paris Agreement are in the vicinity of US$17 trillion per year up to 2100 compared to a very high emission scenario.

Global losses reveal rapidly rising costs due to extreme weather events since the 1970s. Socio-economic factors have contributed to the observed trend of global losses, such as population growth and increased wealth. Part of the growth is also related to regional climatic factors, e.g., changes in precipitation and flooding events. It is difficult to quantify the relative impact of socio-economic factors and climate change on the observed trend. The trend does, however, suggest increasing vulnerability of social systems to climate change.

Economic inequality 

Climate change has contributed towards global economic inequality. Wealthy countries in colder regions have either felt little overall economic impact from climate change, or possibly benefited, whereas poor hotter countries very likely grew less than if global warming had not occurred.

The total economic impacts from climate change are difficult to estimate, but increase for higher temperature changes. For instance, total damages are estimated to be 90% less if global warming is limited to 1.5 °C compared to 3.66 °C, a warming level chosen to represent no mitigation. One study found a 3.5% reduction in global GDP by the end of the century if warming is limited to 3 °C, excluding the potential effect of tipping points. Another study noted that global economic impact is underestimated by a factor of two to eight when tipping points are excluded from consideration. In the Oxford Economics high emission scenario, a temperature rise of 2 degrees by 2050 would reduce global GDP by 2.5% – 7.5%. By the year 2100 in this case, the temperature would rise by 4 degrees, which could reduce the global GDP by 30% in the worst case.

Most affected sectors apart from agriculture and fisheries 
Thermal power stations (fossil fuel plants and nuclear power plants) depend on water to cool them. Not only is there increased demand for fresh water, but climate change can increase the likelihood of drought and fresh water shortages. Another impact for thermal power plants, is that increasing the temperatures in which they operate reduces their efficiency and hence their output. Changes in the amount of river flow correlate with the amount of energy produced by a dam. The result of diminished river flow can be a power shortage in areas that depend heavily on hydroelectric power. Brazil in particular, is vulnerable due to its having reliance on hydroelectricity as increasing temperatures, lower water flow, and alterations in the rainfall regime, could reduce total energy production by 7% annually by the end of the century.

Oil and natural gas infrastructure is affected by the effects of climate change and the increased risk of disasters such as storm, cyclones, flooding and rising sea levels. 
Insurance is an important tool to manage risks, but often unavailable to poorer households. Due to climate change, premiums are going up for certain types of insurance, such as flood insurance. Poor adaptation to climate change further widens the gap between what people can afford and the costs of insurance, as risks increase. In 2019, Munich Re noted that climate change could cause home insurance to become unaffordable for households at or below average incomes.

Roads, airport runways, railway lines and pipelines, (including oil pipelines, sewers, water mains etc.) may require increased maintenance and renewal as they become subject to greater temperature variation. Regions already adversely affected include areas of permafrost, which are subject to high levels of subsidence, resulting in buckling roads, sunken foundations, and severely cracked runways.

Impacts on infrastructure

Human settlements 
A 2020 study projects that regions inhabited by a third of the human population could become as hot as the hottest parts of the Sahara within 50 years without a change in patterns of population growth and without migration, unless greenhouse gas emissions are reduced. The projected annual average temperature of above 29 °C for these regions would be outside the "human temperature niche" – a suggested range for climate biologically suitable for humans based on historical data of mean annual temperatures (MAT) – and the most affected regions have little adaptive capacity as of 2020.

Climate change threatens the health and survival of urban trees and the various benefits they deliver to urban inhabitants.

In 2019 the Crowther Lab from ETH Zürich paired the climatic conditions of 520 major cities worldwide with the predicted climatic conditions of cities in 2050. 22% of the major cities are predicted to have climatic conditions that do not exist in any city today. 2050 London will have a climate similar to 2019 Melbourne, Athens and Madrid like Fez, Morocco, Nairobi like Maputo. The Indian city Pune will be like Bamako in Mali, Bamako will be like Niamey in Niger. Brasilia will be like Goiania.

Increased extreme heat exposure from both climate change and the urban heat island effect threatens urban settlements.

Sea level rise 
A major challenge for human settlements is sea level rise, indicated by ongoing observation and research of rapid declines in ice-mass balance from both Greenland and Antarctica. Estimates for 2100 are at least twice as large as previously estimated by IPCC AR4, with an upper limit of about two meters. Depending on regional changes, increased precipitation patterns can cause more flooding or extended drought stresses water resources.

In small islands and megadeltas, inundation as a result of sea level rise is expected to threaten vital infrastructure and human settlements. This could lead to issues of statelessness for populations in countries such as the Maldives and Tuvalu and homelessness in countries with low-lying areas such as Bangladesh. In 1991, 140,000 people died and the 10 million became homeless when the floods hit Bangladesh. In Myanmar, which was hit in 2007, a storm killed 146,000 people.

Especially affected regions 

The Arctic, Africa, small islands, Asian megadeltas and the Middle East are regions that are likely to be especially affected by climate change. Low-latitude, less-developed regions are at most risk of experiencing negative impacts due to climate change.

The ten countries of the Association of Southeast Asian Nations (ASEAN) are among the most vulnerable in the world to the negative effects of climate change, however, ASEAN's climate mitigation efforts are not commensurate with the climate change threats the region faces. Africa is one of the most vulnerable continents to climate variability and change because of multiple existing stresses and low adaptive capacity. Climate change is projected to decrease freshwater availability in central, south, east and southeast Asia, particularly in large river basins. With population growth and increasing demand from higher standards of living, this decrease could adversely affect more than a billion people by the 2050s. Small islands, whether located in the tropics or higher latitudes, are already exposed to extreme weather events and changes in sea level. This existing exposure will likely make these areas sensitive to the effects of climate change.

Developed countries are also vulnerable to climate change, and have already been negatively affected by increases in the severity and frequency of some extreme weather events, such as heat waves, floods, wildfires, and tropical cyclones.

Low-lying coastal regions 
For historical reasons to do with trade, many of the world's largest and most prosperous cities are on the coast. In developing countries, the poorest often live on floodplains, because it is the only available space, or fertile agricultural land. These settlements often lack infrastructure such as dykes and early warning systems. Poorer communities also tend to lack the insurance, savings, or access to credit needed to recover from disasters.

Socioeconomic impacts of climate change in coastal and low-lying areas will be overwhelmingly adverse. The following impacts were projected in 2007 with very high confidence:
Coastal and low-lying areas would be exposed to increasing risks including coastal erosion due to climate change and sea level rise.
By the 2080s, millions of people would experience floods every year due to sea level rise. The numbers affected were projected to be largest in the densely populated and low-lying mega-deltas of Asia and Africa; and smaller islands were judged to be especially vulnerable.

Given high coastal population density, estimates of the number of people at risk of coastal flooding from climate-driven sea-level rise varies from 190 million, to 300 million or even 640 million in a worst-case scenario related to the instability of the Antarctic ice sheet. The most people affected are in the densely-populated and low-lying megadeltas of Asia and Africa.

The Greenland ice sheet is estimated to have reached a point of no return, continuing to melt even if warming stopped. Over time that would submerge many of the world's coastal cities including low-lying islands, especially combined with storm surges and high tides.

Small islands 

Small islands developing states are especially vulnerable to the effects of climate change, especially sea level rise. They are expected to experience more intense storm surges, salt water intrusion, and coastal destruction. Low-lying small islands in the Pacific, Indian, and Caribbean regions are at risk of permanent inundation and population displacement. On the islands of Fiji, Tonga and western Samoa, concentrations of migrants from outer islands inhabit low and unsafe areas along the coasts.

Atoll nations, which include countries that are composed entirely of the smallest form of islands, called motus, are at risk of entire population displacement. These nations include Kiribati, Maldives, the Marshall Islands, Tokelau, and Tuvalu. Vulnerability is increased by small size, isolation from other land, low financial resources, and lack of protective infrastructure.

A study that engaged the experiences of residents in atoll communities found that the cultural identities of these populations are strongly tied to these lands. Human rights activists argue that the potential loss of entire atoll countries, and consequently the loss of national sovereignty, self-determination, cultures, and indigenous lifestyles cannot be compensated for financially. Some researchers suggest that the focus of international dialogues on these issues should shift from ways to relocate entire communities to strategies that instead allow for these communities to remain on their lands.

Impacts on societies 
Climate change impacts health, the availability of drinking water and food, inequality and economic growth. The effects of climate change are often interlinked and can exacerbate each other as well as existing vulnerabilities. The impacts are often exacerbated by related environmental disruptions and pressures such as pollution and biodiversity loss. Some areas may become too hot for humans to live in. People in some areas may experience internal or long-distance displacement (and thus become climate refugees) triggered by climate change related changes or disasters.

The effects of climate change, in combination with the sustained increases in greenhouse gas emissions, have led scientists to characterize it as a "climate emergency" or "climate crisis". Some climate researchers and activists have called it an "existential threat to civilization". The consequences of climate change, and the failure to address it, can draw focus and resources from tackling its root causes, leading to what researchers have termed a "climate doom loop".

Displacement and migration 

Climate change affects displacement of people in several ways. Firstly, involuntary displacement may increase through the increased number and severity of weather-related disasters which destroy homes and habitats. Effects of climate change such as desertification and rising sea levels gradually erode livelihood and force communities to abandon traditional homelands for more accommodating environments. On the other hand, some households may fall (further) into poverty due to climate change, limiting their ability to move to areas less affected.

According to the Internal Displacement Monitoring Centre in 2020 approximately 30 million people were displaced by extreme weather events while approximately 10 million by violence and wars and climate change significantly contributed to this. The United Nations says there are already 64 million migrants in the world fleeing wars, hunger, persecution and the effects of global warming. In 2018, the World Bank estimated that climate change will cause internal migration of between 31 and 143 million people as they escape crop failures, water scarcity, and sea level rise. The study only included Sub-Saharan Africa, South Asia, and Latin America.Asia and the Pacific is the global area most prone to natural disasters, both in terms of the absolute number of disasters and of populations affected. It is highly exposed to climate impacts, and is home to highly vulnerable population groups, who are disproportionately poor and marginalized. A 2015 Asian Development Bank report highlights "environmental hot spots" that are particular risk of flooding, cyclones, typhoons, and water stress.

Gradual but pervasive environmental change and sudden natural disasters both influence the nature and extent of human migration but in different ways. United Nations High Commissioner for Refugees stated that climate change increases mass displacement, in many regions, including Sahel, East Africa, South Asia, the "drought corridor" in Latin America. 90% of refugees comes from "climate vulnerable hotspots". 

Some Pacific Ocean island nations, such as Tuvalu, Kiribati, and the Maldives, are considering the eventual possibility of evacuation, as flood defense may become economically unrealistic. 

Governments have considered various approaches to reduce migration compelled by environmental conditions in at-risk communities, including programs of social protection, livelihoods development, basic urban infrastructure development, and disaster risk management.  Some experts support migration as an appropriate way for people to cope with environmental changes.  However, this is controversial because migrants – particularly low-skilled ones – are among the most vulnerable people in society and are often denied basic protections and access to services.

Slow-onset disasters and gradual environmental erosion such as desertification, reduction of soil fertility, coastal erosion and sea-level rise are likely to induce long-term migration. Migration related to desertification and reduced soil fertility is likely to be predominantly from rural areas in developing countries to towns and cities.

Conflict 

Climate change can worsen conflicts by exacerbating tensions over limited resources like drinking water (in the case of water conflicts). Climate change also has the potential to cause large population dislocations and migration, which can also lead to increased tensions. However, factors other than climate change are judged to be substantially more important in affecting conflict. These factors include intergroup inequality and low socio-economic development. In some cases, climate change can even lead to more peaceful relationships between groups, as environmental problems requires common policy to be developed.

Global warming has been described as a "threat multiplier". Certain conditions make it more likely that climate change impacts conflict: ethnic exclusion, an economy dependent on agriculture, insufficient infrastructure, poor local governance, and low levels of development. A spike in wheat prices following crop losses from a period of drought may have contributed to the onset of the "Arab Spring" protests and revolutions in 2010.

Social impacts on vulnerable groups 
The impacts of climate change on humans are not distributed uniformly within communities. Individual and social factors such as gender, age, education, ethnicity, geography and language lead to differential vulnerability and capacity to adapt to the effects of climate change. The following more vulnerable groups have been identified:

 People living in poverty: Climate change disproportionally affects poor people in low-income communities and developing countries around the world. Those in poverty have a higher chance of experiencing the ill-effects of climate change due to the increased exposure and vulnerability. A 2020 World Bank paper estimated that between 32 million to 132 million additional people will be pushed into extreme poverty by 2030 due to climate change.
 Women: Climate change increases gender inequality, reduces women's ability to be financially independent, and has an overall negative impact on the social and political rights of women, especially in economies that are heavily based on agriculture.
 Indigenous peoples: Indigenous communities geographically tend to be located in regions more vulnerable to climate change such as native rainforests, the Arctic, and coastal areas. Indigenous communities across the globe generally have economic disadvantages that are not as prevalent in non-indigenous communities due to the ongoing oppression they have experienced. These disadvantages include lower education levels and higher rates of poverty and unemployment, which add to their vulnerability to climate change.
 Children: The Lancet review on health and climate change lists children as the worst-affected category by climate change. Children are also 14–44 percent more likely to die from environmental factors, again leaving them the most vulnerable. Those in urban areas will be affected by lower air quality and overcrowding, and will struggle the most to better their situation.
 Racial minorities: The environmental justice (EJ) movement and climate justice (CJ) movement address environmental racism in bringing attention and enacting change so that marginalized populations are not disproportionately vulnerable to climate change and pollution.

Possibility of societal collapse 

Several researchers have suggested that collapse of the current societal organization – the contemporary global, interconnected civilization – could occur at 3 degrees of warming, especially when considering that climate change is not the only environmental pressure and challenge humanity faces.

Possible responses 

The magnitude of future impacts of climate change can be reduced by climate change mitigation and adaptation.

Mitigation policies currently in place will result in about 2.7 °C (2.0–3.6 °C, depending on how sensitive the climate is to greenhouse gas emissions) warming above pre-industrial levels. If all unconditional pledges and targets made by governments are achieved the temperature will rise by around 2.4 °C. If  additionally all the countries that adopted or are considering to adopt net-zero targets will achieve it the temperature will rise by a median of 1.8 °C. There is a substantial gap between national plans and commitments and actions so far taken by governments around the world.

See also 

 Anthropocene
 Global catastrophic risk
 Politics of climate change

References

Sources 
 .
 .

 .
 . Summary for Policymakers available in Arabic, Chinese, French, Russian, and Spanish.

 . Climate Change 2013 Working Group 1 website.

 . Archived

 .

External links 

 IPCC Working Group I (WG I). Intergovernmental Panel on Climate Change group which assesses the physical scientific aspects of the climate system and climate change.
 Climate from the World Meteorological Organization
 Climate change UN Department of Economic and Social Affairs Sustainable Development
 Effects of climate change from the Met Office
 United Nations Environment Programme and climate change

Climate change and society
Glob
 
 
 
Articles containing video clips